The 2017–18 FA Youth Cup was the 66th edition of the FA Youth Cup. The defending champions were Chelsea and they retained the trophy for the fifth year in a row after a 7–1 aggregate victory over Arsenal in the final.

Calendar

Qualifying rounds

Preliminary round

272 teams took part in the Preliminary round. The lowest level teams competing were from level 11 of the English football league system. The draws were regionalized on a North/South basis.

First round qualifying

260 teams took part in the first qualifying round, with 136 teams having progressed from the previous round. The lowest level teams competing were from level 11 of the English football league system. The draws were regionalized on a North/South basis.

Second round qualifying

152 teams took part in the second qualifying round, with 65 teams having progressed from the previous round.

Third round qualifying

76 teams took part in the third qualifying round, with 38 teams having progressed from the previous round.

First round

84 teams took part in the first round, with 19 teams having progressed from the previous round.

 

† Despite winning the match, Shrewsbury Town were subsequently disqualified after it was found that they had fielded an ineligible player. Evesham United were therefore permitted to advance to the next round instead.

Second round

Third round

Fourth round

Fifth round 

Tie awarded to Colchester United - Reading removed after fielding an ‘under-age’ player inadvertently.

Quarter-finals

Semi-finals

|}

First leg

Second leg

Final

|}

First leg

Second leg

See also
 2017–18 FA Cup

References

External links
 The FA Youth Cup at The Football Association official website

FA Youth Cup seasons
Fa Cup
England